This is a list of fellows of the Royal Society elected in 1981.

Fellows
Norman Laurence Franklin  (1924–1986)
John Guest Phillips  (1933–1987)
Dennis Frederick Evans  (1928–1990)
John Adair Barker  (1925–1995)
Michael Rex Horne  (1921–2000)
Frank Reginald Farmer  (1914–2001)
Fred Brown  (1925–2004)
Autar Singh Paintal  (1925–2004)
David John Wheeler  (1927–2004)
Sir Ian Alexander McGregor  (1922–2007)
Sir Robert William Kerr Honeycombe  (1921–2007)
Sir John McGregor Hill  (1921–2008)
Britton Chance  (1913–2010)
John Ashworth Nelder  (1924–2010)
Walter Plowright  (1923–2010)
Fraser John Bergersen  (1929–2011)
Wallace Leslie William Sargent  (1935–2012)
Ian Butterworth  (1930–2013)
Malcolm Roy Clarke  (1930–2013)
Igor Rostislavovich Shafarevich  (1923–2017) 
Allan Stuart Hay  (1929–2017)
Robert Norman Clayton  (1930–2017)
Eric Albert Barnard  (1927–2018) 
Peter Bradshaw
David Maurice Brink
Brandon Carter
John Horton Conway (1937–2020)
Rex Malcolm Chaplin Dawson
Christopher Forbes Graham
Norman Michael Green
Herbert Gutfreund
Kenneth Charles Holmes
Yuet Wai Kan
Robert Phelan Langlands
Simon Hugh Piper Maddrell
Michael John O'Hara
Edward Roy Pike
Kenneth Alwyne Pounds
Sir David Allan Rees
Colin Bernard Reese
Edward Reich
John Clayton Taylor
James Dewey Watson
Steven Weinberg

References

1981
1981 in science
1981 in the United Kingdom